Firuzabad (also Romanized as Fīrūzābād; also known as Fīrūzābād-e Fenīkhī) is a village in Bostan Rural District, Bostan District, Dasht-e Azadegan County, Khuzestan Province, Iran. At the 2006 census, its population was 162, in 24 families.

References 

Populated places in Dasht-e Azadegan County